Paʼllá Voy is the eleventh Spanish-language and thirteenth studio album by American recording artist Marc Anthony, released on March 4, 2022, by Sony Music Latin  and it was his first album since Opus (2019). Produced by Marc Anthony with long-time collaborator Sergio George along with Motiff as associated producer, it consisted of nine tracks of pure salsa and it was his first album since Opus (2019). According to the artist, the album is an unabashed celebration of salsa in all its forms, and although it includes hard core salsa romantic salsa, son and even boogaloo. While most of the tracks contains heavy on the soneos or improvisations that are at the heart of classic salsa.

It received positive reviews by the critics and was nominated for four Latin Grammy Awards at the 23rd Annual Latin Grammy Awards including Record of the Year and Album of the Year, winning Best Salsa Album. Also, it won Best Tropical Latin Album at the 65th Annual Grammy Awards.

It was supported by the release of three official singles: "Paʼllá voy", "Nada de nada" and "Mala". The album was released on physical format on April 22, 2022. The album debut at number 20 on Billboard Top Latin Albums and number 3 on US Tropical Albums. Also, it charted at number 30 on the Spanish album charts. To promote the album, Anthony embarked on Paʼllá Voy Tour.

Track listing

Chart performance

Certifications

References 

2022 albums
Marc Anthony albums
Albums produced by Sergio George
Sony Music Latin albums
Grammy Award for Best Tropical Latin Album
Latin Grammy Award for Best Salsa Album